Anthony "Thony" Hemery (born 22 November 1972) is a French former freestyle skier. He competed in the men's moguls event at the 1998 Winter Olympics.

References

External links
 

1972 births
Living people
French male freestyle skiers
Olympic freestyle skiers of France
Freestyle skiers at the 1998 Winter Olympics
People from Bourg-Saint-Maurice
Sportspeople from Savoie